FIBA Asia Under-18 Championship for Women 2008 is FIBA Asia's basketball championship for females under 18 years old. The games were held at Medan, Indonesia.

The championship is divided into two levels: Level I and Level II. The top three teams of Level I at the end of the tournament qualifies for the World U-19 Championship for Women. The two lowest finishers of Level I meets the top two finishers to determine which teams qualify for Level for 2010's championship. The losers are relegated to Level II.

Participating teams

Preliminary round

Level I

Level II

Qualifying round
Winners are promoted to Level I for the 2010 championships.

Final round

Semifinals

3rd place

Final

Final standing

Awards

External links
FIBA Asia
www.jabba-net.com

2008
2008 in women's basketball
2008–09 in Asian basketball
2008–09 in Indonesian basketball
International women's basketball competitions hosted by Indonesia
2008 in youth sport
2008 in Indonesian women's sport